Batus barbicornis is a species of beetle in the family Cerambycidae. It was described by Carl Linnaeus in 1764.

Description
Batus barbicornis grows up to 4 centimetres in length. The species shows an aposematic coloration. These beetles are black and have red antennaes with four black bits as well as a few red rectangles on its prothorax and elytra. The adult lays eggs in holes bored in a tree. The larvae feed on wood and represent a severe pest of trees.

Distribution
This species is native to South America. It can be found in Colombia, Venezuela, Ecuador, the Peruvian city of Iquitos, the Brazilian city of Itaituba, Suriname, French Guiana, Guyana and Bolivia.

References

Trachyderini
Beetles described in 1764
Beetles of South America
Arthropods of Colombia
Taxa named by Carl Linnaeus